Ke Kula ʻo Nāwahīokalaniʻōpuʻu is a Hawaiian language immersion charter school. It serves grades K-12 in Keaʻau, Puna, Hawaii Island, Hawaii. It is the largest Hawaiian immersion school on Hawaii Island.

The school began as a Hawaii Department of Education program in 1987. The program became an independent school in 1994, and moved to its current home in Puna shortly thereafter. It was established as a charter school in 2001.

It is named after Joseph Nāwahī.

References

External links 

Official website

Charter schools in Hawaii
Charter K-12 schools in the United States
K-12 schools in Hawaii County, Hawaii
Public high schools in Hawaii County, Hawaii
Language immersion
Educational institutions established in 1994
1994 establishments in Hawaii